Laura Folch Tello (born 21 April 1990) is a Spanish former footballer who played as a midfielder.

Career

She was described as one of Prainsa Zaragoza's most important players in the late 2000s. She represented the club in the 2009 Copa de la Reina de Fútbol against Espanyol, which Espanyol won.

References

1990 births
Living people
Spanish women's footballers
Primera División (women) players
Women's association football midfielders
Zaragoza CFF players
Santa Teresa CD players
Footballers from Zaragoza